In the controlled demolition industry, building implosion is the strategic placing of explosive material and timing of its detonation so that a structure collapses on itself in a matter of seconds, minimizing the physical damage to its immediate surroundings. Despite its terminology, building implosion also includes the controlled demolition of other structures, such as bridges, smokestacks, towers, and tunnels.

Building implosion, which reduces to seconds a process which could take months or years to achieve by other methods, typically occurs in urban areas and often involves large landmark structures.

The actual use of the term "implosion" to refer to the destruction of a building is a misnomer. This had been stated of the destruction of 1515 Tower in West Palm Beach, Florida. "What happens is, you use explosive materials in critical structural connections to allow gravity to bring it down."

Terminology

The term building implosion can be misleading to laymen: The technique is not a true implosion phenomenon. A true implosion usually involves a difference between internal (lower) and external (higher) pressure, or inward and outward forces, that is so large that the structure collapses inward into itself.

In contrast, building implosion techniques do not rely on the difference between internal and external pressure to collapse a structure. Instead, the goal is to induce a progressive collapse by weakening or removing critical supports; therefore, the building can no longer withstand gravity loads and will fail under its own weight.

Numerous small explosives, strategically placed within the structure, are used to catalyze the collapse. Nitroglycerin, dynamite, or other explosives are used to shatter reinforced concrete supports. Linear shaped charges are used to sever steel supports. These explosives are progressively detonated on supports throughout the structure. Then, explosives on the lower floors initiate the controlled collapse.

A simple structure like a chimney can be prepared for demolition in less than a day. Larger or more complex structures can take up to six months of preparation to remove internal walls and wrap columns with fabric and fencing before firing the explosives.

Historical overview

As part of the demolition industry, the history of building implosion is tied to the development of explosives technology.

The use of low velocity explosive produced a deafening explosion that instantly reduced the building to rubble.

The late 19th century saw the erection of—and ultimately the need to demolish—the first skyscrapers, which had more complicated structures, allowing greater heights. This led to other considerations in the explosive demolition of buildings, such as worker and spectator safety and limiting collateral damage. Benefiting from the availability of dynamite, a high-velocity explosive based on a stabilized form of nitroglycerine, and borrowing from techniques used in rock-blasting, such as staggered detonation of several small charges, the process of building implosion gradually became more efficient.

Following World War II, European demolition experts, faced with huge reconstruction projects in dense urban areas, gathered practical knowledge and experience for bringing down large structures without harming adjacent properties. This led to the emergence of a demolition industry that grew and matured during the latter half of the twentieth century. At the same time, the development of more efficient high-velocity explosives, such as RDX, and non-electrical firing systems combined to make this a period of time in which the building implosion technique was extensively used.

Meanwhile, public interest in the spectacle of controlled building explosion also grew. The October 1994 demolition of the Sears Merchandise Center in Philadelphia, Pennsylvania drew a cheering crowd of 50,000, as well as protesters, bands, and street vendors selling building implosion memorabilia. Evolution in the mastery of controlled demolition led to the world record demolition of the Seattle Kingdome on March 26, 2000.

In 1997, the Royal Canberra Hospital in Canberra, Australia, was demolished. The main building did not fully disintegrate and had to be manually demolished. A twelve-year-old girl was killed instantly, and nine others were injured. Large fragments of masonry and metal were found  from the demolition site.

On October 24, 1998, the J. L. Hudson Department Store and Addition in Detroit, Michigan became the tallest, and the largest, building ever imploded.

On December 13, 2009, an unfinished 31-story condominium tower, known as the Ocean Tower, was imploded in South Padre Island, Texas. Construction on the new tower had begun in 2006, but it had been sinking unevenly during construction, which halted in 2008, and could not be saved. It is believed to be one of the tallest reinforced concrete structures ever imploded.

Building implosion has been successfully used at Department of Energy sites such as the Savannah River Site (SRS) in South Carolina and the Hanford Site in Washington. The SRS 185-3K or "K" Area Cooling Tower, built in 1992 to cool the water from the K Reactor, was no longer needed when the Cold War ended and was safely demolished by explosive demolition on May 25, 2010.

The Hanford Site Buildings 337, 337B, and the 309 Exhaust Stack, built in the early 1970s and vacated in the mid-2000s due to deteriorating physical condition, were safely razed by explosive demolition on October 9, 2010.

Gallery

See also
 Controlled Demolition, Inc.
 List of tallest voluntarily demolished buildings

References

External links

Demolition Simulation Advanced structural analysis for predicting demolitions.
A History of Structural Demolition in America by Brent L. Blanchard
How Building Implosions Work by Tom Harris on www.howstuffworks.com
Building Implosions Videos
Bank Implosion Videos and Photos Videos

Building engineering
Demolition
Articles containing video clips